The following is a comparative list of smartphones belonging to the Google Pixel line of devices, all using the Android operating system.

See also
 Comparison of Google Nexus smartphones
 List of Google Play edition devices

References

Computing comparisons
Google hardware
Pixel smartphones, Comparison of
Comparison
Lists of mobile phones